The 2010–11 Munster Rugby season was Munster's tenth season competing in the Celtic League alongside which they also competed in the Heineken Cup for the sixteenth time. They also competed in the European Challenge Cup for the first time after elimination from the Heineken Cup. It was Tony McGahans third season as director of rugby.

Summary
Munster were drawn in Pool 3 of the Heineken Cup alongside the Ospreys, London Irish and RC Toulon. Munster lost 23–17 away to London Irish, before defeating RC Toulon 45–18 at Thomond Park on 16 October 2010.
Munster defeated Ospreys 22–16, but lost the reverse fixture at Liberty Stadium 19–15.
In round 5 Munster went to RC Toulon, losing 32–16. As a result of this defeat, Munster failed to qualify for the quarter finals of the Heineken Cup for the first time in 13 years.
 As one of the top three runners up in the Heineken cup pool stage, Munster entered the quarter-final stage of the Challenge Cup where they defeated Brive 42–37 in France before losing at home 12–20 to Harlequins.

In the Magners league Munster finished top of the table with nineteen wins and three defeats after twenty two matches to qualify for the semi-final playoffs where they defeated Ospreys 18–11. They then played in the 2011 Celtic League Grand Final where they defeated Leinster by 19 points to 9 to claim their third league title.

2010-11 Playing Squad

Coaching and Management team

Players in
 Johne Murphy: from Leicester
 Corey Hircock: from Bedford
 Sam Tuitupou from Worcester Warriors
 Wian du Preez from Free State Cheetahs
 Peter Borlase from Crusaders

Players out
 Jean de Villiers to Western Province and Stormers
 Jeremy Manning to Newcastle Falcons
 Julien Brugnaut to Racing 92
 Ciarán O'Boyle returned to club
 Nick Williams to Aironi
 Eoghan Grace to Exeter Chiefs

2010–11 Celtic League

Playoffs

Semi-final

Grand Final

2010-11 Heineken Cup

Pool 3

2010-11 Amlin Challenge Cup

Quarter-final

Semi-final

References

External links
2010–11 Munster Rugby season official site

2010-11
2010–11 Celtic League by team
2010–11 in Irish rugby union
2010–11 Heineken Cup by team